Donatus Nwoga (30 July 1933 - 1991) was a poetry critic and professor of African literature at the University of Nigeria, Nsukka.

Early life and education 
Nwoga was from Mbaise in Imo State. He studied at St Brigid's School, Ahiara. In the 1950s, Nwoga studied at the University of London and then at Queen's University Belfast, where he attended classes with the poet Seamus Heaney. Nwoga was a founding editor of the student magazine Gorgon and likely the first person to publish Heaney's work.

Research 
Nwoga and Romanus Egudu researched Igbo poetry and published a collection of translated into English. Nwoga taught with Chinua Achebe in the Faculty of Arts at the University of Nigeria, Nsukka.

He was a member of organisations including the African Literature Association, the International African Institute, the Association for Commonwealth Language and Literature Studies, and The Folklore Society.

Publications 
Nwoga was the author of West African Verse: An Anthology, and Poetic Heritage: Igbo Traditional Verse, amongst others.

Death and legacy 
Following Nwoga's death in 1991, Heaney wrote a tribute to him titled "A Dog Was Crying Tonight in Wicklow Also".

The Institute of African Studies at the University of Nigeria, Nsukka, launched a Dictionary of Igbo Proverbs in Nwoga's honour.

A memorial lecture was in Nwoga's name was created at the University of Nigeria, Nsukka. In the opening remarks of the 2020 lecture, Dean of the Faculty of Arts Nnanyelugo Okoro described Nwoga as "a humanist and intellectual elephant.

References 

Nigerian literary critics
1933 births
1991 deaths
Igbo academics
Queen's University at Kingston alumni